Eupithecia praepupillata is a moth in the family Geometridae. It is found in Russia (southern Primorje) and Korea.

The wingspan is 18.5–23 mm. The forewing ground colour is greyish white, the costa thinly covered with ochreous or yellowish scales. The hindwing ground colour is paler, greyish white with pale blackish transverse lines in the basal, medial and subterminal areas. There is one generation per year with adults on wing from early September to late October. The species possibly overwinters as an egg.

References

Moths described in 1927
praepupillata
Moths of Asia